William Henry Rowden (May 12, 1930 – October 15, 2022) was a vice admiral in the United States Navy. He was a former commander of the United States Sixth Fleet (from June 1981 – July 1983). He also served as Deputy Chief of Naval Operations (Surface Warfare) and Commander, Naval Sea Systems Command. He was a 1952 graduate of the United States Naval Academy. In retirement, he served as a director of the Naval Historical Foundation.

References

1930 births
2022 deaths
Burials at Arlington National Cemetery
People from Woodsville, New Hampshire
United States Naval Academy alumni
United States Navy admirals
NAVSEA commanders